Professor Munjed Al Muderis (born 1972) is an Australian Adjunct Clinical Professor in orthopaedic surgery, author and human rights activist. He has done pioneering work on prosthetics, especially on titanium devices.

Al Muderis was born in Iraq to a rich family and became a surgeon under the regime of Saddam Hussein. He was a medical student in Basra at the start of the Gulf War in August 1990. As a junior surgeon, he emigrated from Iraq to Australia. He traveled through Indonesia and Malaysia and reached Australia where he was kept in at an immigration detention centre near Derby, Western Australia. He was released after 10 months and carried on his career in medicine, eventually specialising in osseointegration surgery.

Al Muderis wrote the book Walking Free on his experiences in Iraq, in the Australian immigration detention system, and on his career in Australia.

Early life 
Munjed Al Muderis was born under the regime of Saddam Hussein in Iraq. His father was a former judge of the Supreme Court of Iraq and had authority in the Marine Corps, while his uncle was a descendant of the second royal family and Prime Minister, back when Iraq was still a kingdom. His mother was a school principal who had been demoted for refusing to join the Baath Party.

Al Muderis graduated from Baghdad College High School in 1991, where he was a classmate of Qusay Hussein. He went on to study medicine at various universities, including the Baghdad University from 1991 to 1997, graduating with a Bachelor of Medicine, Bachelor of Surgery.

At the beginning of the Gulf War he was a second year medical student in Basra. He fled the city in the early days of the war, returning later to see the aftermath of the Basra uprising.

In 1999, he was forced to flee Iraq when he was working as a junior surgeon at Saddam Hussein Medical Centre in Baghdad. A busload of army draft evaders were brought into the hospital for the top of their ears to be amputated under Saddam Hussein's orders. The senior surgeon in the operating theatre refused the orders and was immediately interrogated and shot in front of several medical staff. Instead of complying with the orders, Al Muderis decided to flee. He escaped the operating theatre and hid in the female toilets for five hours. Shortly after, he fled to Jordan before the authorities caught up with him and moved on to Kuala Lumpur. From there, he took a people-smuggling route to Christmas Island, where he was sent to the Curtin Immigration Reception and Processing Centre. He was detained there until his identity was verified, given the number 982. He was punished with solitary confinement and was repeatedly told to go back where he came from after fellow detainees who caused riots blamed him. Ten months after being sent to the detention centre, he was granted refugee status and freed.

Upon release, he only landed a job at Mildura Base Hospital as an emergency unit and orthopaedic resident, after sending out more than 100 resumes. A year later, he moved to the Austin Hospital in Melbourne and travelled to many different countries, completing specialisation fellowships and attending short-term courses.

Osseointegration 
Al Muderis developed the new generation of implant, osseointegration prosthetic limb (OPL), which addresses several issues previously faced by patients. This led Orthopedics This Week to praise Al Muderis's work as 'The Most Incredible Orthopedics You'll Ever Read About.' The Osseointegration Group of Australia Team (OGAP) is made up of specialists in various fields. Women's Weekly and NEWS rank Al Muderis as one of the world's top osseointegration surgeons.

Traditional and rigid socket based technology is now replaced with a surgery that inserts a titanium implant into the bone. Osseoperception occurs as the prosthetic is anchored directly to the bone which would transmit sensory signals, resulting in patients recovering a certain level of feeling. The implant's surface is also made of highly porous titanium, providing the user with balance and allowing for ingrowth of bone. A dual adaptor is designed with a smooth surface to minimise friction and coated with titanium niobium for antibacterial purposes. The adaptor is fixed to a control device and is connected to the exterior of the prosthetic limb. Putting on and taking off the limb can be done in less than ten seconds. Osseointegration surgery aims to provide amputees with greater mobility and reduced discomfort.

Al Muderis is spreading the word to make the technology available globally. Patients travel from around the world to see him for this groundbreaking surgery.

Career 
Al Muderis was a first year resident at Saddam Hussein Medical Centre in Baghdad before he fled Iraq and his career was disrupted. In Australia, he first worked at Mildura Base Hospital as an emergency unit and orthopaedic resident. He moved to Melbourne four months later and worked at Austin Repatriation Hospital as a surgical registrar, followed by a year at Canberra Hospital.

In 2004, he joined the Australian Orthopaedic Training Program. In 2008, he attained his surgical fellowship, FRACS (Orth). He completed the following post specialisation fellowships:
Fellowship in Lower Limb Arthroplasty at the Sydney Adventist and Baulkham Hills Hospitals, Australia
Fellowship in Hip and Knee Arthroplasty with Prof. Dr. Med Jorg Scholz at the Emil Von Behring Hospital, Germany
Trauma Fellowship with Prof. Dr. Med. Axel Ekkernkamp at the Unfallkrankenhaus Berlin, Germany
Robotic leg surgery post-specialisation training with Dr Horst Aschoff at Lubeck, Germany

Al Muderis is a supervisor of the Australian Orthopaedic Trainee Registrar at the above-mentioned medical centres, and is a supervisor of overseas trained orthopaedic surgeons (Fellows) in hip and knee pathology.
 
In 2010, Al Muderis commenced his private practice. He is an orthopaedic surgeon and treats his patients at Macquarie University, Bella Vista, Drummoyne and Sydney Adventist Hospital clinics. He is also appointed as an adjunct clinical associate professor in the School of Medicine, Sydney Campus at the University of Notre Dame Australia and a clinical lecturer at Macquarie University Hospital and the Australian School of Advanced Medicine. He also has appointments at the Sydney Adventist Hospital and Norwest Private Hospital. He is a fellow of the Royal Australasian College of Surgeons and the Australian Orthopaedic Association. He is also the founder of the Osseointegration Group of Australia.

As an Australian orthopaedic surgeon, he specialises in hip, knee, trauma and osseointegration surgery, focusing in hip arthroscopy, resurfacing, arthroplasty, knee arthroplasty and reconstruction of recurrent patellar dislocations.

Al Muderis chaired the 2015 Osseointegration Conference and was a guest speaker at Australian Orthotic Prosthetist Association Meeting.

Al Muderis has been recognised by Queen Elizabeth II for his work with British soldier Michael Swain. He was invited by Queen Elizabeth II to attend the ceremony in which Swain received his MBE medal.

He also caught the attention of Prince Harry of Wales, who visited Al Muderis on 7 May 2015 to follow up on Al Muderis' work and meet some of the amputees he has helped, including a decorated British soldier who lost his legs in Afghanistan who was undergoing groundbreaking treatment to fit prosthetic legs at Macquarie University Hospital.

Prince Harry was amazed by the work Al Muderis and his team are doing, and believes the life changing surgery is "the way forward for single amputees or double amputees above the knee". The Prince was keen to get Al Muderis to the UK for an extended period of time to make the procedure available to British ex-servicemen injured in combat.

Al Muderis is hopeful that the royal's profile will give the procedure more exposure, and that as it becomes more well known this technology will become more available to the common day to day person.

Al Muderis has connected prosthetic limbs to dozens of UK soldiers.

The UK Ministry of Defence (MoD) is spending £2m on trials that were to begin in 2016 and involve 20 amputees who were to undergo Al Muderis' osseointegration procedure. Al Muderis has trained five British surgeons and they were to perform the surgeries together, then monitor those 20 cases for two years. A similar project was in the works for Canada and Houston, Texas.

Al Muderis has presented and published numerous research reports on osseointegration surgery for amputees, how to measure growth rate in children, limited incision plating technique in management of clavicle fracture and describing new patterns of distal clavicle fractures dislocation.

He has written two books about his life and experiences, the first in 2014, called Walking Free, and later in 2019 Going Back published by Allen & Unwin.

Al Muderis was nominated for 2020 NSW Australian of the Year award for his humanitarian work and contribution to medicine.

Controversy 
In 2022, a joint investigation by The Age, The Sydney Morning Herald and 60 Minutes alleged there were serious questions around Al Muderis's approach to patient selection and aftercare. Four patients described experiences ranging from life-changing to life-destroying. It was suggested that risks were minimised when their operations were explained to them, complications ignored and patients left wheelchair-bound or mutilated.

Subsequently, a concerns notice was issued by lawyers for Al Muderis to Nine Publications, 60 Minutes, The Sydney Morning Herald and The Age newspapers, to commence defamation proceedings. Over 60 allegations were detailed in the 41-page notice. Nine and Fairfax failed to respond to the concerns notice, within the 28 days' notice period. On 31 October 2022, Al Muderis issued defamation proceedings against Channel Nine, Fairfax Publications and the Age Company in the Federal Court of Australia

At the end of 2022, a report emerged of Al Muderis not appropriately obtaining consent from a patient in 2016 for a procedure to be performed on his behalf by a trainee doctor and robot. He was accused of obtaining research funding in order to employ orthopaedic trainees to run multiple operating theatres simultaneously. The source was anonymous.

Humanitarian work

Beyond the Boats 
Al Muderis was involved in a high-level round table on asylum and refugee policy held on 11 July 2014 at Parliament House which led to the Asylum and Refugee Policy report "Beyond The Boats: building an asylum and refugee policy for the long term". He related his own experience as a refugee to discussions about a new approach to asylum seeker policy.

Amnesty International 
Al Muderis is passionate about campaigning to protect human rights through his work with Amnesty International, including leading the 2015 Human Rights Lecture. He has spoken extensively about the plight of refugees and asylum seekers in various public speaking opportunities and lectures.

Red Cross 
Al Muderis in 2015 became an Australian ambassador for the Red Cross. He has spoken out about the misconceptions around seeking asylum in Australia and joined a panel at a live screening for SBS' "Go Back To Where You Came From" in the hopes of building a more compassionate and caring community.

UNBROKEN 
In February 2023, Al Muderis was made an ambassador to the UNBROKEN project In Ukraine after leading a team of Australian doctors who performed more than 20 extremely complex limb reconstructions and prosthetics operations at the hospital of the First Medical Association of Lviv.

Other 
He is a patron of the Asylum Seekers Centre, a not-for-profit that provides personal and practical support to people seeking asylum in Australia.

Al Muderis visited patients at the Children's Surgical Centre in Cambodia on 20 September 2015 to provide their patients with osseointegration procedures.

Successful surgeries 
Al Muderis' clinics at Norwest Private Hospital, Macquarie University and Sydney Adventist Hospital in Sydney are known worldwide as centres of excellence, according to News.com.au.

Personal life 
Al Muderis has two sons and two daughters from previous relationships. He is now in a de facto relationship with Claudia Roberts.

Books 
Walking Free was published in October 2014, written by Al Muderis and contributed to by Patrick Weaver. It was published by Allen & Unwin. In his book, he shared his life and experience in Iraq under Saddam Hussein's regime, his journey to seek asylum in Australia and how he worked towards being a world leader in osseointegration surgery. His second memoir, Going Back, was published in 2019 by Allen & Unwin.

Publications 
The Under-Recognised Capitellar Lesion Associated With Radial Head Fractures. This article by Al Muderis describes the seriousness of missing to diagnose radial head fractures and properly treat them.
Current evidence of extracorporeal shock wave therapy in chronic Achilles tendinopathy. impact factor 1.53. In this paper Al Muderis and his co-authors describe the benefit of shock wave therapy in the treatment of painful achilles tendonopathy.
Minimally invasive medial patellofemoral ligament reconstruction for patellar instability using an artificial ligament: A two-year follow-up. 1.70 Impact Factor. In this paper Al Muderis describes a new technology to reconstruct the medial patellofemoral ligament in patients with patellar instability using artificial ligament with a minimum of two years followup.
Osseointegrated total knee replacement connected to a lower limb prosthesis: 4 cases. 2.45 Impact Factor. This paper presents the first four cases where a combination of total knee replacement with transcutaneous osseointegration were performed for below knee amputees.
Arthroscopically assisted fixation of the lesser trochanter fracture: a case series. This paper presents the first three cases of avulsed lesser trochanter fractures in teenagers that were internally fixed utilising keyhole surgical techniques.
Percutaneous Epidural Lysis of Adhesions in Chronic Lumbar Radicular Pain: A Randomized, Double-Blind, Placebo-Controlled Trial. 4.77 Impact Factor.
Cementless Total Hip Arthroplasty Using the Spongiosa-I Fully Coated Cancellous Metal Surface A Minimum Twenty-Year Follow-up. 4.31 Impact Factor.
Alternative Bearing Designs for Hip Resurfacing Arthroplasty.
Zebra lines of pamidronate therapy in children.4.31 Impact Factor. In this paper Al Muderis describes the ability for the first time to accurately measure growth rate in children via measuring the distance between the bisphosphonate discs and comparing that to the time interval of receiving the injections.
Primary septic arthritis of the knee due to Neisseria meningitides.

Media 
Both newspaper publications and radio talk shows have shared the story of Al Muderis, from his journey of fleeing Iraq to his job as an osseointegration surgeon in Sydney, Australia.

Public speaking 
Ted X Sydney 2015 - Dr Al Muderis gave one of the most powerful speeches at the Sydney opera house in 2015 about his concept of the "Wheel of Fortune" and how now that he is on top of his "wheel," he can assist people who are on the bottom. He shared his experiences as a refugee and the struggles he faced to get where he is today, and the passion that inspired him to develop and expand on the pioneering osseointegration surgery that is changing the lives of amputees around the world. He talks about his story, from refugee to medical revolutionary.
Amnesty international speaking events in several cities around Australia
Red Cross - Ambassador Al Muderis spoke on a panel at a live screening event held in Sydney to kick off SBS' new series of "Go Back To Where You Came From" to discuss the facts and misconceptions about seeking asylum in Australia.

Newspapers and publications 
New York Times Iraqi Surgeon Returns Home to Help the Wounded Get Back in the Fight
News.com.au - The Terminator captured the imagination of a 12-year-old boy in 1984 who went on to become a leading orthopaedic surgeon. Pioneering osseointegration with titanium rod implants, his work has been recognised by the Queen of the United Kingdom and Price Harry of Wales.
Sunday Morning Herald - The astonishing journey of surgeon Munjed Al Muderis.
Daily Telegraph - Prince Harry of Wales visited Macquarie University Clinic and Prof Munjed Al Muderis whose groundbreaking surgery has helped soldiers walk again after losing their legs.
News.com.au - Price Harry of Wales is helping to push the groundbreaking osseointegration technology.
ACT News - Osseointegration helps above-the-knee amputees. The titanium rod is inserted in the bone and connected through an opening or stoma in the stump to an external prosthetic limb.
News Breakers
The Advocate - Red Cross welcomes Dr Munjed Al Muderis as new Ambassador.
The Guardian - Refugees in Australia fear speaking out about asylum, according to Al Muderis.
The Advocate - Refugee surgeon rises to hop.
Getty Images - Prince Harry of Wales.
Medianet - Macquarie University Hospital to welcome Prince Harry.
SBS World News - A new paper drawing on wide expertise and all sides of politics is offering a closer look at Australia's asylum policies and possible alternatives.
Monthly Chronicle - From refugee to surgeon.
field Fisher - Prince Harry meets Osseointegration pioneer Munjed Al Muderis.
APHA.org.au - The advantages of bionic prosthetics, life changing surgery for double amputee at Norwest Private Hospital.
 Mid Devon Gazette - Tiverton amputee Caroline heads to Oz for pioneering and life changing surgery.
 International Business Times UK - Afghanistan war hero remortgages home to undergo reconstructive surgery in Australia.
 Precinct News - Munjed Al Muderis, a bright young man, was determined to become a surgeon even in war-torn Iraq.
 Orthopedics This Week - A sharp mind - accompanied by a big heart; a humanitarian voicing the plight of refugees, and providing orthopedic services to disaster areas. Al Muderis. A pioneering surgeon in the field of Osseointegration.
 Sunday People - War hero Clive Smith to undergo ground breaking surgery in Australia. Munjed Al Muderis to fit bionic limbs.
 Sunday People - War veteran Clive Smith takes first steps and is able to walk unaided after one month.
 Sunday People - Soldier who lost legs in Afghanistan to receive treatment from Al Muderis
 Precinct News - Profiling Munjed Al Muderis
 The Telegraph - Afghanistan war veteran has to remortgage home to fund limb surgery.
 The Telegraph - NHS delays leave injured Afghanistan veterans without working prosthetic limbs.
 The Huffington Post - Cate Blanchett: 'I Have Seen Firsthand The Determination Refugees Have To Protect Their Children'
 The Weekly Review - Mentors reveal their 7 ingredients for success
 TIRR Memorial Hermann Journal - Osseointegration: A New Solution for Trans-femoral Limb-loss Patients

Radio 
ABC Classic FM
89.9Light FM (Melbourne)
Ellen Fanning producing conversations; one hour interview on 19 August 2015. "Dr Munjed Al Muderis restores mobility with robotic limbs."
Sunday Night
ABC Radio National Breakfast
89.9 Light FM
Fiveaa
AudioBoom
Radio New Zealand National
The Wire Interviewed by Jessica Ball, Dr Munjed Al Muderis talks about his experience as an asylum seeker in a story about refugee policy.

TV 
Sunday Night Channel 7
Insight SBS
The Project Channel 10
Sunrise Channel 7
ABC 7:30 Report
3 News.co.nz
BBC.co.uk
Al Jazeera English
CTV News Edmonton
One News 
A Current Affair Channel 9
Nine News

References

External links

1972 births
Living people
Australian orthopaedic surgeons
University of Baghdad alumni
Fellows of the Royal Australasian College of Surgeons
Iraqi emigrants to Australia
University of Notre Dame Australia people
Asia Game Changer Award winners